Claude Silvestre, Count Colaud (12 December 1754 – 4 December 1819) was a French Napoleonic general and senator.

Biography
Colaud was born at Briançon on 12 December 1754. In 1801, for his military services, he was made a senator of the French Consulate by the First Consul Napoleon Bonaparte. He was also made a Grand Officer of the Legion of Honour. He died in Paris on 4 December 1819. His name is inscribed on column five northern pillar of the Arc de Triomphe.

Notes

References

External links

1754 births
1819 deaths
Grand Officiers of the Légion d'honneur
Peers of France
Names inscribed under the Arc de Triomphe
French Republican military leaders of the French Revolutionary Wars
Military leaders of the French Revolutionary Wars
French generals
People from Briançon
People from Hautes-Alpes
Burials at Père Lachaise Cemetery